Andrew G. Patrick  (1907–1955) was an American architect who specialized in churches and schools, mostly for Catholic clients in Connecticut.

Early life and education
Patrick was born in Bridgeport, Connecticut, in 1905. He lived in Stratford, Connecticut, where he attended the university school. He graduated from Notre Dame School of Architecture in 1931 and thereafter served in the military for a time.

Architectural practice
He then worked with the  architectural firm Fletcher-Thompson where he was associated with noted architect J. Gerald Phelan. Both men designed many churches, schools, convents and rectories for Catholic clients.

Works 
 Our Lady of Good Counsel Church, Bridgeport, Connecticut
 Holy Name of Jesus Church, Stratford, Connecticut
 St. James School, Stratford, Connecticut
 St. James Church, Stratford, Connecticut (redesign of church built by J. Gerald Phelan)
 Auditorium, Our Lady of Peace Church, Stratford, Connecticut
 Our Lady Of Grace Church, Stratford, Connecticut
 St. Stephen Church, Trumbull, Connecticut

References

Further reading

1907 births
1955 deaths
Architects from Bridgeport, Connecticut
American ecclesiastical architects
Architects of Roman Catholic churches
University of Notre Dame alumni
20th-century American architects